Nigel Lappin (born 21 June 1976) is a former professional Australian rules footballer. Lappin is currently serving as an assistant coach with the Geelong Football Club.

Playing career
Lappin was born in the locally based regional hospital at Corowa, New South Wales and grew up in Chiltern, Victoria. He was drafted to play for the Brisbane Bears in the Australian Football League in 1993, playing his first AFL game the following year.  In 1997 he was a member of the inaugural Brisbane Lions team following the Bears merger with Fitzroy.

A long, accurate kick, capable of running as a play maker throughout the whole match, he was recognised as a member of the group of players known as the "Fab Four", a group of highly skilled midfield players considered to be one of the major driving forces behind the Lions successive Australian Football League premierships in 2001, 2002 and 2003. An example of his courage was the 2003 Grand Final win, in which he played the whole match with a broken rib.

Lappin represented Australia in International Rules in 2001.

In 2004 he achieved a personal milestone in winning his first Merrett-Murray Medal. However his 2005 season ended prematurely when he broke his right ankle late in the season. Weeks into his comeback, the ankle was re-injured in a 2006 pre-season practice match, forcing him to miss the entire 2006 season.

Following the retirement of longtime captain Michael Voss at the end of 2006, Lappin was appointed co-captain of the club alongside Simon Black, Luke Power, Jonathan Brown, and Chris Johnson on 20 March 2007.

His cousin Matthew Lappin also played AFL football for Carlton and St. Kilda.

Retirement
On 19 August 2008, Nigel Lappin announced his retirement from professional football. After only being able to play 4 games in the 2008 season due to an Achilles tendon problem, Nigel decided it was time to draw a close on his career. "I'm really disappointed this season hasn't worked out for me," Lappin said at a Gabba press conference. "Every footballer wants the fairytale ending. It's hard to walk away from something that's been a really big part of your life, but I've got a family that will care for me." He was the last remaining member of the Brisbane Lions inaugural Round 1, 1997 team.

In October 2008, Lappin joined the Geelong Football Club as an assistant coach. In 2016 he was inducted into the Australian Football Hall of Fame.

Statistics

|-
|- style="background-color: #EAEAEA"
! scope="row" style="text-align:center" | 1994
|style="text-align:center;"|
| 44 || 17 || 8 || 3 || 115 || 82 || 197 || 37 || 11 || 0.5 || 0.2 || 6.8 || 4.8 || 11.6 || 2.2 || 0.6
|-
! scope="row" style="text-align:center" | 1995
|style="text-align:center;"|
| 44 || 19 || 17 || 18 || 179 || 80 || 259 || 56 || 14 || 0.9 || 0.9 || 9.4 || 4.2 || 13.6 || 2.9 || 0.7
|- style="background-color: #EAEAEA"
! scope="row" style="text-align:center" | 1996
|style="text-align:center;"|
| 44 || 25 || 15 || 15 || 376 || 126 || 502 || 118 || 16 || 0.6 || 0.6 || 15.0 || 5.0 || 20.1 || 4.7 || 0.6
|-
! scope="row" style="text-align:center" | 1997
|style="text-align:center;"|
| 44 || 21 || 10 || 14 || 281 || 119 || 400 || 107 || 17 || 0.5 || 0.7 || 13.4 || 5.7 || 19.0 || 5.1 || 0.8
|- style="background-color: #EAEAEA"
! scope="row" style="text-align:center" | 1998
|style="text-align:center;"|
| 44 || 20 || 15 || 12 || 269 || 130 || 399 || 96 || 15 || 0.8 || 0.6 || 13.5 || 6.5 || 20.0 || 4.8 || 0.8
|-
! scope="row" style="text-align:center" | 1999
|style="text-align:center;"|
| 44 || 25 || 23 || 23 || 281 || 185 || 466 || 109 || 29 || 0.9 || 0.9 || 11.2 || 7.4 || 18.6 || 4.4 || 1.2
|- style="background-color: #EAEAEA"
! scope="row" style="text-align:center" | 2000
|style="text-align:center;"|
| 44 || 24 || 16 || 12 || 337 || 179 || 516 || 107 || 33 || 0.7 || 0.5 || 14.0 || 7.5 || 21.5 || 4.5 || 1.4
|-
! scope="row" style="text-align:center;" | 2001
|style="text-align:center;"|
| 44 || 25 || 26 || 19 || 383 || 232 || 615 || 157 || 50 || 1.0 || 0.8 || 15.3 || 9.3 || 24.6 || 6.3 || 2.0
|- style="background-color: #EAEAEA"
! scope="row" style="text-align:center;" | 2002
|style="text-align:center;"|
| 44 || 18 || 7 || 12 || 275 || 167 || 442 || 92 || 74 || 0.4 || 0.7 || 15.3 || 9.3 || 24.6 || 5.1 || 4.1
|-
! scope="row" style="text-align:center;" | 2003
|style="text-align:center;"|
| 44 || 22 || 8 || 15 || 371 || 191 || 562 || 124 || 70 || 0.4 || 0.7 || 16.9 || 8.7 || 25.5 || 5.6 || 3.2
|- style="background-color: #EAEAEA"
! scope="row" style="text-align:center" | 2004
|style="text-align:center;"|
| 44 || 25 || 17 || 17 || 379 || 251 || 630 || 115 || 121 || 0.7 || 0.7 || 15.2 || 10.0 || 25.2 || 4.6 || 4.8
|-
! scope="row" style="text-align:center" | 2005
|style="text-align:center;"|
| 44 || 16 || 8 || 5 || 220 || 147 || 367 || 76 || 49 || 0.5 || 0.3 || 13.8 || 9.2 || 22.9 || 4.8 || 3.1
|- style="background-color: #EAEAEA"
! scope="row" style="text-align:center" | 2006
|style="text-align:center;"|
| 44 || 0 || — || — || — || — || — || — || — || — || — || — || — || — || — || —
|-
! scope="row" style="text-align:center" | 2007
|style="text-align:center;"|
| 44 || 18 || 4 || 6 || 257 || 225 || 482 || 85 || 75 || 0.2 || 0.3 || 14.3 || 12.5 || 26.8 || 4.7 || 4.2
|- style="background-color: #EAEAEA"
! scope="row" style="text-align:center" | 2008
|style="text-align:center;"|
| 44 || 4 || 0 || 2 || 35 || 39 || 74 || 14 || 22 || 0.0 || 0.5 || 8.8 || 9.8 || 18.5 || 3.5 || 5.5
|- class="sortbottom"
! colspan=3| Career
! 279
! 174
! 173
! 3758
! 2153
! 5911
! 1293
! 596
! 0.6
! 0.6
! 13.5
! 7.7
! 21.2
! 4.6
! 2.1
|}

Career highlights

Teal Cup
Victorian & All-Australian U15 Schoolboys 1991
Victorian Country & All-Australian Teal Cup (U17) 1993
Winner Chiltern Best & Fairest 1993
Brisbane Bears/Lions
Best & Fairest 2004
Victorian State of Origin 1996, 1997, 1999
First Brisbane-based AFL player to win Victorian State of Origin Selection
Member Bears First Finals Side 1995
Member Lions First Finals Side 1997
Ansett Cup Grand Final Side 2001
Brisbane Lions captain 2007
Australian Asthma Sportsman of the Year 1998
All-Australian 2001, 2002, 2003, 2004
International Rules 2001,
Premiership Player 2001, 2002, 2003

References

External links
 Butcher's boy to champion

1976 births
Australian rules footballers from New South Wales
Australian rules footballers from Victoria (Australia)
Brisbane Bears players
Brisbane Lions players
Brisbane Lions Premiership players
Brisbane Lions captains
All-Australians (AFL)
Victorian State of Origin players
Merrett–Murray Medal winners
Living people
Australian Football Hall of Fame inductees
Australia international rules football team players
Three-time VFL/AFL Premiership players